A wedge is a triangular-shaped simple machine.

Wedge, The Wedge, or Wedges may also refer to:

Common meanings

 Wedge (footwear), a type of shoe
 Wedge (golf), a type of golf club

Culture

Fictional characters
 Wedge (Transformers), an Autobot, leader of the Build Team in the "Transformers: Robots in Disguise" toy line
 Wedge Antilles, a character in the Star Wars films
 Wedge, a recurring character in the Final Fantasy video game series; see Biggs and Wedge

Music
 The Wedge (album), by the British band Pallas
 "The Wedge" (song), by American band Phish, 1993
 Prelude and Fugue in E minor, BWV 548, a work by Johann Sebastian Bach sometimes called "The Wedge"
 Wedge Records, a record label

Television
 The Wedge (Australian TV series), a sketch show on Network Ten, aired until 2007
 The Wedge (Canadian TV series), a music show on MuchMusic, aired until 2014

Publications
 The Wedge (poetry), a collection by William Carlos Williams
 Wedge: The Secret War between the FBI and CIA, a book by Mark Riebling

Linguistics
 Wedge (phonetics), the International Phonetic Alphabet symbol 
 Caron, háček or wedge, a diacritic symbol

Mathematics
 Wedge (geometry), a polyhedral solid
 Wedge (symbol), a symbol which is interpreted as logical conjunction ("and")
 Wedge product, the exterior product of vectors

People
 Wedge (surname), a list of people with the surname
 Nickname of Warren Grimm (1888–1919), American Legion Post Commander killed in the Centralia massacre

Places

United States
 Wedge International Tower, in Houston, Texas
 The Wedge (surfing), a surf spot in Newport Beach, California
 Wedges Creek, Wisconsin
 Wedge Plantation, South Carolina
 Lowry Hill East, Minneapolis, a neighborhood nicknamed "the Wedge" in Minneapolis, Minnesota
 Wedge (border), a small area of Delaware that was disputed between Maryland, Pennsylvania, and Delaware until 1921

Antarctica
 Wedge Face, on the Shackleton Coast, Antarctica
 Wedge Ridge, in Coats Land, Antarctica

Elsewhere
 Wedge Island (disambiguation), various islands (also a settlement and a locality) in Australia and Canada
 Wedge Mountain, in British Columbia, Canada
 The Wedge (Alberta), a mountain in the Fisher Range of the Canadian Rockies

Geographical features
 Wedge (border), a small tract of land along the borders of Delaware, Maryland and Pennsylvania
 The Wedge (Montana), a mountain range
 Wedge Peak (Alaska)
 Wedge Pass

Food
 Submarine sandwich
 Potato wedges, a large cut of potatoes fried and eaten as a side dish

Companies
 Wedge Community Co-op, a grocery in Minneapolis, Minnesota, United States
 Wedge Group, a British galvanising company

Other uses
 Flying wedge, a troop formation
 The Wedge, the narrowest house in Britain, located on the island of Great Cumbrae
 DOS Wedge, a piece of software for the Commodore 64 computer
 TVR Wedges, a series of sports cars
 The wedge, a weather phenomenon resulting from cold air damming
 Wedge issue or wedge politics, means of weakening one's political opponents 
 Wedge strategy, a creationist political and social action plan

See also 
 Wedgie
 Wedge-tailed eagle, known in Australian English as a "wedgie"